The 1986 Shell Oilers season was the second season of the franchise in the Philippine Basketball Association (PBA). Known as Shell Helix in the All-Filipino Conference and Formula Shell in the Third Conference.

Transactions

Occurrences
After dropping their first two outings in the semifinals against Great Taste by one point in overtime and Ginebra, 106–113 on May 15, coach Freddie Webb decided to resign from his position.  Webb was replaced by former Manila Beer coach Edgardo Ocampo. 

Perry Young, a Portland third round draft selection in 1985, was a late replacement for the injured Fred Reynolds and played for the Shell's last four games in the Third Conference.

Records
On November 16 which was the last playing date in the quarterfinal round of the Open Conference, Formula Shell recorded the second largest winning margin of 54 points in a 154–100 victory over already qualified Tanduay Rhum Makers, which got another all-time record of 13 triples from import Rob Williams. The win broke the six-game losing streak of the Spark Aiders. 

The match was delayed for almost one and a half hours after import Dexter Shouse' powerful dunk late in the second quarter cause the ULTRA north goal to mis-aligned. The Spark Aiders were eliminated from the semifinal round when Great Taste prevailed over Alaska Milk later in the night.

Roster

Imports

References

Shell Turbo Chargers seasons
Shell